Mulatu Teshome Wirtu (born 1957) is an Ethiopian politician who was the president of Ethiopia from 2013 to 2018.

Biography
Mulatu was born in the town of Arjo in Welega Province. He was educated in China, receiving his bachelor's degree in philosophy of political economy and doctorate in international law at Peking University. He received his Master of Arts in Law and Diplomacy from The Fletcher School of Law and Diplomacy at Tufts University in 1990. He taught at some "foreign universities and institutions", according to Speaker Abadula Gemeda.

In the mid-1990s he was Deputy Minister of Economic Development and Cooperation under Minister Girma Birru, and he was appointed as Minister of Agriculture in 2001. He was also Speaker of the House of Federation from 2002 to 2005. He served as Ethiopia's Ambassador to China, Japan, Turkey, and Azerbaijan.

While serving as Ambassador to Turkey, he was elected as President of Ethiopia by a unanimous parliamentary vote on 7 October 2013. Girma Seifu of the Unity for Democracy and Justice, the sole opposition member of parliament, welcomed his election. Like his predecessors Girma Wolde-Giorgis and Negasso Gidada, he is Oromo.

Mulatu has one son.

References

 

1955 births
Ambassadors of Ethiopia to China
Ambassadors of Ethiopia to Japan
Ambassadors of Ethiopia to Turkey
Government ministers of Ethiopia
Living people
Oromo people
Presidents of Ethiopia
Peking University alumni
Beijing Language and Culture University alumni
Ethiopian Orthodox Christians
Ethiopian Oriental Orthodox Christians
Oromo Democratic Party politicians
Ethiopian People's Revolutionary Democratic Front politicians
Speakers of the House of Federation
Ambassadors of Ethiopia to Azerbaijan
People from Oromia Region
20th-century Ethiopian politicians
21st-century Ethiopian politicians